Acaricoris is a genus of flat bugs in the family Aradidae. There are about eight described species in Acaricoris.

Species
These eight species belong to the genus Acaricoris:
 Acaricoris austeris Drake & Kormilev
 Acaricoris barroanus Drake & Kormilev
 Acaricoris clausus Drake & Kormilev
 Acaricoris dureti Kormilev
 Acaricoris floridus Drake, 1957
 Acaricoris haitiensis Kormilev
 Acaricoris ignotus Harris & Drake, 1944
 Acaricoris robertae Heiss & Poinar, 2012

References

Aradidae
Articles created by Qbugbot
Pentatomomorpha genera